The BYU Cougars women's basketball team represents Brigham Young University in the West Coast Conference. The Cougars play their home games in the Marriott Center in Provo, Utah.

History
Records have been kept since the 1972–73 season. In the 1981–82 season, the BYU women's basketball team beat Oregon State when it made it to the post-season, but then it lost to University of Hawaii in the second round. BYU went to the third round of the NCAA Tournament in 2002, and lost to University of Tennessee.

Coaches

Results by season

Postseason appearances

NCAA Division I

AIAW Division I
The Cougars made three appearances in the AIAW National Division I basketball tournament, with a combined record of 1–3.

Notable players
Tina Gunn Robison, 1976–1980
Tresa Spaulding Hamson, 1983–1987
Erin Thorn, 1999–2003
Ambrosia Anderson, 2002–2006
Jennifer Hamson, 2010–2014

References

External links